Upgrade & Afterlife is the fourth studio album by American indie rock band Gastr del Sol, released on June 17, 1996 by Drag City.

The album cover is Wasserstiefel (Water Boots) by Swiss artist Roman Signer.

Composition
Pitchfork writer Nitsuh Abebe characterized Upgrade & Afterlife as a post-rock album where "folk and avant-garde abstract each other into something warm, minimal, and slanted".

"Our Exquisite Replica of "Eternity"" contains a sample of the score from the 1957 science fiction film The Incredible Shrinking Man. The title of the track is derived from the name of a cheap perfume marketed in public bathroom vending machines.

"Dry Bones in the Valley (I Saw the Light Come Shining 'Round and 'Round)" is a cover of a John Fahey song, and features Tony Conrad on violin. According to David Grubbs, the idea of having Conrad play on "Dry Bones in the Valley" came to fruition after a Gastr del Sol show in Atlanta, where Grubbs observed Conrad "literally dancing with excitement" while Jim O'Rourke played the song alone onstage as an encore.

Several sources misidentify track 3 as "The Sea Uncertain". This title, correctly rendered, appears to refer playfully both to a track on Gastr's previous full-length release titled "The C in Cake" and to one of Gastr percussionist John McEntire's other bands, The Sea and Cake, a moniker derived from McEntire's mishearing of that title.

Track listing

References

External links
 

1996 albums
Gastr del Sol albums
Drag City (record label) albums